Sandy Montgomery is an American softball coach. In 29 years as the head coach of SIU Edwardsville Cougars softball (1989–present), she has more than 1000 career wins, more than any other coach in SIUE history in any sport, male or female. As of May 13, 2017, Montgomery had a career record of 1026 wins, 519 losses, and 2 ties, for a .664 winning percentage. She led the Cougars to the Division II NCAA softball championship in 2007. In 2014, Montgomery passed the 900 win mark while leading the Cougars to their first Division I NCAA Division I softball tournament. Montgomery is the longest-tenured head coach at SIUE and the Associate AD for Alumni Relations in the SIUE athletic department. In addition to coaching softball, she began the SIUE volleyball program in 1995 and coached for its first four years, guiding it to a record of 83–54 and its first appearance in the NCAA Division II tournament in 1998. After leading the softball Cougars to the regular season title, Montgomery was named the 2015 Ohio Valley Conference Coach of the Year.  Montgomery's players earned her 1000th career victory in a 4–2 win over the Holy Cross Crusaders in the "Under Armour Showcase" in Clearwater, Florida on March 10, 2017. She became only the 32nd head coach in all divisions to top the 1,000 win mark.

SIUE pitcher
Primary source: 

Sandy Montgomery was a pitcher for the SIUE Cougars from 1982 through 1985 building a record of 84–26 in 117 appearances, including 108 starts. On the Cougars' career pitching records lists, she remains #1 in lowest earned run average (ERA) (0.85 in 789 innings), saves (11, including saves in games she started, was relieved, and returned), shutouts (42), and no-hitters (6). She also remains #2 in most batters faced (3210), #3 in wins and innings pitched, and #4 in strikeouts, appearances, and games started,. Additionally, she still holds the Cougars' single-season records for most shutouts (19 in 1985) and saves (7 also in 1985) while remaining among the leaders in wins, lowest ERA, appearances, games started, shutouts, innings pitched, strikeouts, batters faced, and saves.  In her senior season (1985), Montgomery had a record of 30-8 with a 0.64 earned run average, was the Cougars' Most Valuable Player, and was named to the National Fastpitch Coaches Association’s All-Central Region team. For her play, she has been inducted into the Illinois Amateur Softball Association’s Hall of Fame (2001) and the SIUE Athletics Hall of Fame (2006).

Head coaching record
Sources:

References

External links
 SIUE softball webpage

Living people
SIU Edwardsville Cougars softball coaches
SIU Edwardsville Cougars softball players
Year of birth missing (living people)
Place of birth missing (living people)